Wigton railway station is a railway station serving the market town of Wigton in Cumbria, England. It is owned by Network Rail and managed by Northern Trains.

History
The station was opened by the Maryport and Carlisle Railway on 10 May 1843, following the completion of the route from Carlisle. It would act as a temporary terminus until the opening of the line heading south-west towards Aspatria in 1845.

It subsequently become the junction station for the eastern end of the loop to Mealsgate from 1878. This portion of the route did not prove profitable, and the single daily return passenger service was withdrawn by the Maryport and Carlisle Railway in 1921.

Goods facilities at the station were withdrawn by British Rail in October 1970. A private siding for the nearby plastics factory remains in place, but this has been disused for a number of years. The station's signal box is still operational, and acts as a fringe to Carlisle PSB.

In December 2018, the Victorian-era footbridge connecting the platforms was deemed unsafe by Network Rail, and access to it was prohibited. The bridge was removed in March 2019 for repairs, and reinstalled in July 2019.

Facilities
As with most other stations on the line, it is unstaffed, and has been so since 1969. The two side platforms here are slightly offset and linked by a footbridge. A ticket machine is now in service to allow intending travellers to buy before boarding. There are waiting shelters on both platforms, but the surviving station buildings are no longer in railway use. Step-free access is available to each platform, whilst train running information is provided by display screens, telephone and timetable posters.

Services

During the evening, the station is served by an hourly service between Carlisle and Whitehaven. All services are operated by Northern Trains.

Rolling stock used: Class 156 Super Sprinter and Class 158 Express Sprinter

References

External links

 
 

Railway stations in Cumbria
DfT Category F1 stations
Former Maryport and Carlisle Railway stations
Railway stations in Great Britain opened in 1843
Northern franchise railway stations
1843 establishments in England
Wigton